Havengore may refer to:

 Havengore Island, a marshy island off the  North Sea coast of the English county of Essex
 MV Havengore, a Port of London survey launch built in 1956 and famous for its role in the funeral of Sir Winston Churchill
 SY Havengore, a steam yacht built in 1910 and used as a patrol vessel by the Port of London